Aaron Woodley (born 1971) is a Canadian film director and screenwriter.

Early life
Woodley was born in Toronto, Ontario, the son of costume designer Denise Cronenberg and nephew of filmmaker David Cronenberg. He studied animations at Art Gallery of Ontario and later graduate at York University.

Career
Woodley's 1998 short film The Wager won Short Film Award at Austin Film Festival. In 2003, he directed Rhinoceros Eyes in which Michael Pitt starred. A year later, he directed Lee Daniels-produced film Tennessee which starred singer and actress Mariah Carey.

In 2015, Variety announced that Woodley would direct the animated film Spark featuring the voices of Jessica Biel and Susan Sarandon.

In 2019, Woodley was appointed as the director of network brands of Knowledge Network.

Filmography

References

External links

1971 births
Living people
Jewish Canadian writers
Canadian people of Lithuanian-Jewish descent
20th-century Canadian screenwriters
Film directors from Toronto
Writers from Toronto
Jewish Canadian filmmakers
20th-century Canadian male writers
21st-century Canadian screenwriters
21st-century Canadian male writers
Canadian male screenwriters